Gamaliel is a home rule-class city in Monroe County, Kentucky, in the United States. The population was 376 at the 2010 census, this was a decline from 439 in 2000.

Geography
Gamaliel is located at  (36.639956, -85.793372).

History
Around 1836, James Crawford and John Hayes saw that a town was springing up and donated ten acres of land, at a point where their farms met, to be used for educational and religious purposes. On this property, a building was erected and used for school and church and, in 1844, a cemetery was added. In making the grant, the two men stipulated that seven trustees should be appointed to administer the property along the lines provided by the donors. The original trustees were William Crawford, Maston Comer, John Hayes, Robert Welch, James Crawford Jr., Charles Browning Jr., and John Meador. This act of incorporation was passed by the General Assembly of the Commonwealth of Kentucky on December 19, 1840.

Samuel DeWitt, a local preacher and teacher, said "Gamaliel" was a good biblical name (In the Book of Acts, the Pharisee appears speaking in favor of recently arrested Christians) and this was a good village and the town took the name that he suggested. A post office was established in the community in 1870.

Demographics

As of the census of 2000, there were 439 people, 196 households, and 129 families residing in the city. The racial makeup of the city was 97.95% White, 0.46% Native American, 1.37% from other races, and 0.23% from two or more races. Hispanic or Latino of any race were 1.59% of the population.

There were 196 households, out of which 26.5% had children under the age of 18 living with them, 53.1% were married couples living together, 9.2% had a female householder with no husband present, and 33.7% were non-families. 32.1% of all households were made up of individuals, and 20.4% had someone living alone who was 65 years of age or older. The average household size was 2.24 and the average family size was 2.79.

In the city, the population was spread out, with 21.4% under the age of 18, 6.6% from 18 to 24, 26.0% from 25 to 44, 26.0% from 45 to 64, and 20.0% who were 65 years of age or older. The median age was 42 years. For every 100 females, there were 86.0 males. For every 100 females age 18 and over, there were 79.7 males.

The median income for a household in the city was $23,833, and the median income for a family was $29,000. Males had a median income of $22,167 versus $16,083 for females. The per capita income for the city was $12,940. About 11.2% of families and 12.1% of the population were below the poverty line, including 9.8% of those under age 18 and 12.5% of those age 65 or over.

Climate
The climate in this area is characterized by hot, humid summers and generally mild to cool winters. According to the Köppen Climate Classification system, Gamaliel has a humid subtropical climate, abbreviated "Cfa" on climate maps.

References

Cities in Kentucky
Cities in Monroe County, Kentucky